Cerro Alto Mountain is a mountain in western Texas east of El Paso along U.S. Route 180. It is the highest point in the Hueco Mountains.

The awelo of the Tigua Indians is believed to reside near Cerro Alto Mountain. Which began during their arrival in the 17th century.

See also
Geography of Texas

References

Landforms of Hudspeth County, Texas
Mountains of Texas